Able Bodies is the second studio album by American band From Indian Lakes. It was originally released independently in November 2012.

Track listing
 Anything (4:02)
 We Are Sick (3:10)
 Paintings (3:14)
 Breaking My Bones (3:48)
 I Don’t Know You (3:12)
 Stay Outside (4:30)
 Below (4:34)
 My Mouth, My Lips (4:26)
 Your Son (3:19)
 We Follow (3:46)
 ‘Till I Can Walk (4:50)

References

2012 albums
Post-rock albums by American artists
From Indian Lakes albums